The history of the Jews in Cambodia is based on very small numbers of Jews working or settling in modern-day Cambodia, as well as many Jewish tourists who pass through.

Facts and figures
There is a Chabad house run by a rabbi in the city of Phnom Penh.

An American Jewish attorney, law professor, prosecutor and criminologist Phil Weiner was knighted by the Cambodian government for his training of Cambodian law enforcement officers.  He received the Royal Order of Sahametrei.

Elior Koroghli, a granddaughter of a Cambodian princess who had converted from Theravada Buddhism to Orthodox Judaism and great-granddaughter of King Monivong, who ruled Cambodia until 1941, celebrated her Bat Mitzva in Cambodia.

Cambodian women have become a source for the human hair for wigs, known as sheitels worn by very religious Orthodox Jewish women. This has become a lucrative export for Cambodia.

A Jewish philanthropy in America, Jewish Helping Hands, helps support an orphanage in Phum Thom and Phnom Penh.

Cambodia–Israel relations

Cambodia and Israel established diplomatic ties in 1960. In 1972, Cambodia opened its embassy in Israel in Jerusalem. However, Israel cut its ties with Cambodia in 1975 due to the rise of the Khmer Rouge regime. Ties were restored in 1993.

References

Cambodia
Jews
Jews and Judaism in Cambodia
Cambodia